Nawkhanda is a village in Gopalganj District, Bangladesh, part of Muksudpur Upazila. The village covers an area of 3 km2, and is bordered by the villages of Nanikhir, Barovatra, Pathorgatha and Kasalia, Goinary. Nawkhanda's main canal is the Hatashe Channel, locally called Nawkhanda Khall or Nanikhir Khall. The Bil Rout Canal at Jalirpar joins with the Hatashe Canal to the river Padma

Nawkhanda under Nanikhir Union parishad was established in 1634. The village consists of three wards and few mahallas. The village has a primary school, seven mosques, an Alia Madrasa, and few community schools.

Non-governmental organizations operating in Nawkhanda include BDAO (the Bangladesh Development Acceleration Organisation), BRAC, CCDB, ASA, World Vision, and HCCB.

Populated places in Dhaka Division